Yuri Ivanovich Klyuchnikov (born 20 April 1963) is a former Russian professional football referee and a player. He made his professional debut in the Soviet Second League in 1982 for FC Sokol Saratov.

Honours
 Soviet Top League bronze: 1986.

References

1963 births
Sportspeople from Saratov
Living people
Soviet footballers
Russian footballers
Association football defenders
Soviet Top League players
Russian Premier League players
FC SKA Rostov-on-Don players
FC Spartak Moscow players
FC Rostov players
FC Sokol Saratov players
Russian football referees
Russian expatriate footballers
Expatriate footballers in Finland